Speleogobius is a genus of goby native to the Mediterranean Sea.

Species
There are currently 2 recognized species in this genus:
 Speleogobius llorisi Kovačić, Ordines & Schliewen, 2016 
 Speleogobius trigloides Zander & H. J. Jelinek, 1976 (Grotto goby)

References

 
Gobiidae